Keshdhari Hindus (Punjabi: ਕੇਸ਼ਧਾਰੀ ਹਿੰਦੂ ) means "Hindus with long hairs". It has been a controversial and derogatory term used by Rashtriya Swayamsevak Sangh for Sikhs.

The Sikh leadership rejects the categorization of Sikhs as Keshdhari Hindus and claims that Sikhism is a unique religion with a unique message.

See also
 Sects of Sikhism
 Sanatan Sikh
 Rashtriya Sikh Sangat

References

Hindutva
Rashtriya Swayamsevak Sangh
Hindu nationalism